List of ice hockey clubs in Spain sorted by division:

Superliga Española 2010/2011 season
CG Puigcerdà (Puigcerdà)
FC Barcelona (Barcelona)
Txuri-Urdin (San Sebastián)
SAD Majadahonda (Majadahonda)
Aramón Jaca (Jaca)

Teams not competing
CH Vielha (Vielha e Mijaran)
CH Villalba (Vilalba)
Anglet Hormadi  (Anglet)

 
Spain teams
Ice hockey